The Lemaître exhaust is a type of steam locomotive exhaust system developed by the Belgian engineer Maurice Lemaître.

Construction

The Lemaître exhaust featured a blastpipe with 5 nozzles in a circular pattern exhausting up a large-diameter chimney stack, with a variable area nozzle exhausting up the centre, and improved efficiency by about 10%.

Uses
The Lemaître exhaust was used extensively in Great Britain by OVS Bulleid on his new locomotive designs for the Southern Railway, namely the Merchant Navy, Light Pacific and Q1 classes.  Bulleid also retro-fitted Lemaître exhausts on some older classes, such as the SR Lord Nelson class and some of the SR V Schools class.

Further Development
The design was later improved by Livio Dante Porta, who created the Lempor and Lemprex, named after a combination of their two names.

References

External links
The ultimate steam page - Steam Locomotive Exhaust Drawings
Lempor Exhaust

Steam locomotive exhaust systems
Steam locomotive technologies